Acrocercops autadelpha is a moth of the family Gracillariidae. It is known from New South Wales and Queensland, Australia.

The wingspan is about 8 mm. Adults have a fringe along the trailing edge of each wing. The forewings have a striking pattern of white and brown markings with darker lines outlining each brown mark. The hindwings are golden brown.

The larvae feed on Banksia species.

References

autadelpha
Moths of Australia
Moths described in 1880